Port of Ketapang is a ferry seaport located in Ketapang Village, Banyuwangi Regency, East Java, Indonesia that connects eastern coast of Java with Bali. The port is operated by ASDP Indonesia Ferry, a state-owned port authority company. Travellers who are planning to visit Bali via land route may ferry from this port and harbor at Port of Gilimanuk in western Bali. The average ferry duration between the two harbors are usually about 1 hour. The harbor is planned to be fully integrated with Probolinggo-Banyuwangi Toll Road in 2021.

See also 

 Banyuwangi International Airport
 Ketapang railway station

References 

Banyuwangi Regency
K